Diogo Kent Hubner (born 30 January 1983) is a Brazilian handball player for São Caetano and the Brazilian national team.

Titles
Pan American Men's Club Handball Championship:
2014, 2017
South and Central American Men's Club Handball Championship:
2021

References

1983 births
Living people
Brazilian male handball players
Place of birth missing (living people)
Handball players at the 2016 Summer Olympics
Olympic handball players of Brazil
Handball players at the 2015 Pan American Games
Pan American Games medalists in handball
Pan American Games gold medalists for Brazil
Medalists at the 2015 Pan American Games
21st-century Brazilian people